Mbugwe–Rangi are a pair of Bantu languages left after the languages of Zone F.30 in Guthrie's classification were reclassified. According to Nurse & Philippson (2003), they form a valid node.
  Mbugwe, Rangi (Langi)

Footnotes

References